The 2022–23 Wright State Raiders men's basketball team represented Wright State University in the 2022–23 NCAA Division I men's basketball season. The Raiders, led by seventh-year head coach Scott Nagy, played their home games at the Nutter Center in Dayton, Ohio as members of the Horizon League.

Season Summary
For Wright State, 2022-23 began under the shadow of having lost its two leading scorers not to graduation or injury, but to the new open transfer rules.  Grant Basile left for the Virginia Tech Hokies and Tanner Holden for The Ohio State Buckeyes.  This fueled the concerns of supporters who worry about Wright State’s ability to compete in the NIL era.  Veteran CJ Wilbourn was also unavailable much of the season due to injury.

It was a frustratingly mediocre season.  After winning 20 or more games for the last six non-shortened seasons, they finished 10-10 in the Horizon league and only 18-15 overall.  The losses and many of the victories were marked by turnovers and defensive breakdowns.  Like most Scott Nagy teams, the Raiders were one of the top-scoring teams in the nation averaging nearly 80 points per game with a 49.6% field goal percentage.    

New red-shirt freshman Brandon Noel was able to make up some of the loss in the front-court, winning Horizon League Freshman of the Year honors while displaying a surprising level of athleticism.  However, like many freshman his scoring and defense proved inconsistent game to game, in particular against veteran opponents who could match him physically.  

Trey Calvin led the team with outstanding play at point guard, serving both as court general and the most consistent offensive weapon.  He finished the season first team all Horizon League.   Sophomores Alex Huibregtse and Andrew Welage showed good improvement as the season went on, hinting at better things to come.

Previous Season
The Raiders finished the 2021–22 season 22–14, 15–7 in Horizon League play to finish in fourth place. As the No. 4 seed, they defeated Oakland, Cleveland State, and Northern Kentucky to win the Horizon League tournament. They received the conference's automatic bid to the NCAA tournament as the No. 16 seed in the South Region, where they defeated Bryant in the First Four, before losing in the first round to Arizona.

Roster

Schedule and results

|-
!colspan=12 style=| Regular season

|-
!colspan=9 style=| Horizon League tournament

|-

Sources

References

Wright State Raiders men's basketball seasons
Wright State Raiders
Wright State Raiders men's basketball
Wright State Raiders men's basketball